The 1896 United States presidential election in Mississippi took place on November 3, 1896. All contemporary 45 states were part of the 1896 United States presidential election. Mississippi voters chose nine electors to the Electoral College, which selected the president and vice president.

Mississippi was won by the Democratic nominees, former U.S. Representative William Jennings Bryan of Nebraska and his running mate Arthur Sewall of Maine. With black disfranchisement virtually complete due to onerous poll taxes and literacy tests, Mississippi would begin seven decades as a one-party Democratic state, as the state completely lacked areas of upland or German refugee whites opposed to secession. No Republican would serve in the state legislature between 1902 and the 1960s, and only once until 1950 – when Herbert Hoover won riding on anti-Catholic and Prohibitionist sentiment the Pine Belt counties of Pearl River, Stone and George in 1928 – would the state Democratic nominee lose a Mississippi county in any Presidential election.

Results

Results by county

Notes

References

Mississippi
1896
1896 Mississippi elections